North Warwickshire and South Leicestershire College - North Warwickshire and Hinckley Campus, previously North Warwickshire and Hinckley College, is a Further Education College with main campuses in Nuneaton, Hinckley, Harrowbrook and Wigston. The college offers apprenticeships, full-time, and part-time further and higher education courses.

History

The college began in 1910 as the Nuneaton Technical College and the Nuneaton School of Art, with the technical college catering mainly to mining students. In 1913, the college moved to a larger building containing a laboratory, lecture room, drawing room, and handicraft room, only for the college to close between 1914 and 1919 due to the First World War. When the college reopened after the war, it changed its structure to include general education courses. The college grew further and relocated again in 1923, becoming the County Mining and Technical School in 1932. The size and scope of the education provided continued to grow over the next two decades, and in 1952 the art school was amalgamated with the college to form the Nuneaton Technical College and School of Art, and in 1958 the main campus was relocated to Hinckley Road, where it remains.

The college was subsequently renamed North Warwickshire College of Technology and Art until the merger with Hinckley College to become North Warwickshire and Hinckley College in 1996.

Since the start of the academic year in 2017, North Warwickshire and Hinckley Colleges have merged with South Leicestershire College to form North Warwickshire and South Leicestershire College.

Campus developments

New Hinckley Campus
In September 2011, the College opened a new Hinckley Campus located on Lower Bond Street in the town centre. The £13m campus is home to the college's Creative Arts provision.

Engineering Centre
In September 2011, a £1.5 million investment from Warwickshire County Council funded the development of a new engineering facility at the college's Nuneaton Campus. The Advanced Engineering Centre has workshop space, conference facilities, and classrooms, as well as specialist equipment..

Harrowbrook Construction Centre
The Construction Center is home to the college's brickwork, carpentry, environmental technologies, painting and decorating, and forklift truck engineering departments.

Mira Technology Institute

Campus locations
The college has five campuses and a Digital Skills academy located at Coventry University Technology Park.

Nuneaton Campus – located on Hinckley Road, Nuneaton
Hinckley Campus – located on Lower Bond Street, Hinckley,
Mira Technology Institute (MTI) – located on MIRA Technology Park, Nuneaton
Harrowbrook Campus – located on Harrowbrook Industrial Estate, Hinckley
Wigston Campus – located on Blaby Road, South Wigston
Digital Skills Academy – located at Coventry University Technology Park, Coventry

Higher education
The college runs over 30 Higher Education and professional courses working with several universities.

Midland Academies Trust
The Midland Academies Trust (MAT) is an independent charitable organisation established by North Warwickshire & South Leicestershire College, a Department for Education approved academy sponsor, to support local schools.

Notable alumni
 Bill Olner, Member of Parliament for Nuneaton (1992–2010)
 Gareth Edwards (director), Film Director Godzilla
 Tom Bewick, chief executive, Creative & Cultural Skills (2004–2010)
 The Real Cole Castle, ex-fever nightclub addict and YouTuber. Recently banned from Fever for theft of alcohol.

References

External links
College Website

Educational institutions established in 1996
Learning and Skills Beacons
Further education colleges in Warwickshire
Nuneaton
Hinckley
1996 establishments in England